Lindsay Vaughn is an American politician serving as a member of the Kansas House of Representatives from the 22nd district. Elected in the November 2020, she assumed office on January 11, 2021.

Early life and education 
Vaughn was born in Overland Park, Kansas, and graduated from Blue Valley Northwest High School. She earned a Bachelor of Arts degree in political science and cultural anthropology from the University of North Carolina at Chapel Hill.

Career 
Vaughn has worked as a volunteer coordinator for Literary KC. In 2018, she was a field organizer for Sharice Davids. She was also the chair of the Johnson County Young Democrats. She worked on the campaigns of state representatives Brett Parker and Brandon Woodard.

Vaughn was elected to the Kansas House of Representatives in November 2020 and assumed office on January 11, 2021.

References 

Living people
People from Overland Park, Kansas
Democratic Party members of the Kansas House of Representatives
Women state legislators in Kansas
University of North Carolina at Chapel Hill alumni
21st-century American politicians
21st-century American women politicians
Year of birth missing (living people)